Kenneth Brander (born April 18, 1962) is an American rabbi who is president and Rosh HaYeshiva of the Ohr Torah Stone network of institutions. He is a member of the Jewish Federations of North America’s Rabbinic Cabinet Round Table.

Biography
Brander is a 1984 alumnus of Yeshiva College and received his ordination from the Rabbi Isaac Elchanan Theological Seminary where he was a student of Rabbi Joseph B. Soloveitchik. He studied at Florida Atlantic University, obtaining a PhD in general philosophy and comparative literature. His dissertation was titled "The Temple in Jerusalem Idealized and the Historic-Synagogue-Institution: A Study in Synagogue Purposes in an American Context."

From 1990 to 1991, Brander was the acting rabbi of New York's Lincoln Square Synagogue, after serving for four years as its assistant rabbi. He served as the senior rabbi of the Boca Raton Synagogue for 14 years (1991–2005). From 2005 to 2018, he served as vice president of Yeshiva University. In 2018, he assumed the position of President and Rosh HaYeshiva of Ohr Torah Stone.

Works

“Kabbalat Shabbat: Why Is This Night Different from All Others?” in Mitokh Ha-Ohel, From Within the Tent: The Shabbat Prayers ed. Daniel Z. Feldman and Stuart W. Halpern (Maggid Books: Jerusalem, 2016), 37–44.
“Fashioning Our Spiritual Garb” in Mitokh Ha-Ohel, From Within the Tent: Essays on the weekly Haftarah Reading ed. Daniel Z. Feldman and Stuart W. Halpern (Maggid Books: Jerusalem, 2011), 451–456.
“We have Met the Enemy … and He Is Us” in Mitokh Ha-Ohel, From Within the Tent: The Weekly Parashah ed. Daniel Z. Feldman and Stuart W. Halpern (Maggid Books: Jerusalem, 2010), 101–107.
“Our Members, Our Communities: A ‘Sh’ma’ Roundtable,” Sh’ma: A Journal of Jewish Responsibility, October 2012, 9–13.
“In the Eye of the Storm: Shabbat Observance During a Hurricane or Severe WeatherEvent,” Journal of Halakha and Contemporary Society, LXIV (Fall 2012), 41–65.
“Ethics in Philanthropy: Should Synagogues and Mosdot Chinuch Accept Tainted Funds,” in Toward a Renewed Ethic of Jewish Philanthropy, The Orthodox Forum 19, Ed. Yossi Prager (Ktav: Jersey City, 2010), 291–306.
“Introduction,” Life Values and Intimacy Education: Health Education for the Jewish School, Grades 3 – 8, ed. Yocheved Debow and Anna Woloski-Wruble (Ktav: Jersey City, 2008).
“Foreword,” The West Side Institutional Synagogue Megilat Esther, ed. Shlomo Einhorn (I.S, Press: New York, 2008): 7–14.
“The Rov as a Personal Rebbe,” in Mentor of Generations: Reflections on Rabbi Joseph B. Soloveitchik, ed. Zev Eleff (Ktav: Newark, 2008), 324–328.
“Sex Selection and Halakhic Ethics: A Contemporary Discussion,” Tradition 40:1 (Spring 2007), 45–78.
“Memories of a Giant,” in Memories of a Giant: Eulogies in Memory of Rabbi Dr. Joseph B. Soloveitchik zt"l, ed. M. A. Bierman (Urim: Jerusalem and New York, 2003).
“Gynecological Procedures and Their Interface with Halakha,” Journal of Halakha and Contemporary Society, XLII (Fall 2001), 30–44.
“Artificial Insemination and Surrogate Motherhood through the Prism of Jewish Law,” B’Or Ha’Torah, XII, (2000), 59–65.
“Chanukah Through the Prism of Rabbi Joseph B. Soloveitchik’s Teachings”, Jewish Action 60:2, (Winter 1999).
“An Analysis of Had Gadya”, Journal of Jewish Music and Liturgy, (New York, 1995).
“Tutorial Programs For Hebrew Schools,” The Pedagogic Reporter: A Forum for Jewish Education, Jewish Education Service of North America, Inc., 40:1 (1989).
Editor, The Yeshiva University Haggadah (Ktav: New York, 1985).
“Laws and Approaches Regarding the Commandment to Live and Settle in Eretz Yisrael,” Beit Yitzchak, (New York, 1987) (Hebrew), 155–164.

Personal life
In 2018, he moved from the United States to Israel with his family. He has five children.

Further reading
 Ohr Torah Stone
 Center for Jewish–Christian Understanding and Cooperation (CJCUC)

External links

References

1964 births
Israeli Modern Orthodox rabbis
Religious Zionist Orthodox rabbis
American Modern Orthodox rabbis
Living people
Rabbi Isaac Elchanan Theological Seminary semikhah recipients
American emigrants to Israel
Orthodox rabbis from New York City
Christian and Jewish interfaith dialogue
Yeshiva University alumni
Yeshiva University faculty
20th-century American rabbis
21st-century American rabbis